al-Walid ibn Abd al-Malik ibn Marwan, commonly known as al-Walid I, was the sixth Umayyad caliph, ruling from October 705 until his death. He was the eldest son of his predecessor Caliph Abd al-Malik. As a prince, he led annual raids against the Byzantines from 695 to 698 and built or restored fortifications along the Syrian Desert route to Mecca.

Under al-Walid, his father's efforts to centralize government, impose a more Arabic and Islamic character to the state, and expand its borders were continued. He heavily depended on al-Hajjaj ibn Yusuf, his father's powerful viceroy over the eastern half of the caliphate. During his reign, armies commissioned by al-Hajjaj conquered Sind and Transoxiana in the east, while the troops of Musa ibn Nusayr conquered the Maghreb and Hispania in the west, bringing the caliphate to its largest territorial extent. War spoils from the conquests enabled al-Walid to finance impressive public works, including his greatest architectural achievement, the Great Mosque of Damascus, as well as the al-Aqsa Mosque in Jerusalem and the Prophet's Mosque in Medina. He was the first caliph to institute programs for social welfare, aiding the poor and handicapped among the Muslim Arabs of Syria, who held him in high esteem. 

His reign was marked by domestic peace and prosperity and likely represented the peak of Umayyad power, though it is difficult to ascertain his direct role in its affairs. The balance al-Walid maintained among the elites, including the Qays–Yaman army factions, may have been his chief personal achievement. The massive military expenditures during his rule, as well as his generous grants to members of the ruling family, financially burdened his successors.

Early life
His father, Abd al-Malik ibn Marwan, was a member of the Umayyad dynasty. While Mu'awiya belonged to the Umayyads' Sufyanid branch, resident in Syria, al-Walid's family was part of the larger Abu al-As line in the Hejaz (western Arabia, where Mecca and Medina are located). His mother, Wallada bint al-Abbas ibn al-Jaz, was a descendant of Zuhayr ibn Jadhima, a famous 6th-century chief of the Banu Abs tribe. In 684, after Umayyad rule collapsed amid the Second Muslim Civil War, the Umayyads of the Hejaz were expelled by a rival claimant to the caliphate, Abd Allah ibn al-Zubayr. They relocated to Syria, where al-Walid's grandfather, the elder statesman Marwan I, was recognized as caliph by pro-Umayyad Arab tribes in the region. With the tribes' support, he gradually restored the dynasty's rule in Syria and Egypt. Abd al-Malik succeeded Marwan and conquered the rest of the caliphate, namely Iraq, with its eastern dependencies, and Arabia. With the key assistance of his viceroy of Iraq, al-Hajjaj ibn Yusuf, Abd al-Malik instituted several centralization measures, which consolidated Umayyad territorial gains.

The war with the Byzantine Empire, which dated to the Muslim conquest of Syria in the 630s, resumed in 692 after the collapse of the truce that had been reached three years earlier. Annual campaigns were thereafter launched by the Umayyads in the Arab–Byzantine frontier zone and beyond. During his father's caliphate, al-Walid led the campaigns in 695, 696, 697 and 698. In his summer 696 campaign, he raided the area between Malatya (Melitene) and al-Massisa (Mopsuestia), while in the following year, he targeted a place known in Arabic sources as 'Atmar', located at some point north of Malatya. He also led the annual Hajj pilgrim caravan to Mecca in 698.

In 700 or 701, al-Walid patronized the construction or expansion of Qasr Burqu', a fortified Syrian Desert outpost connecting Palmyra in the north with the Azraq oasis and Wadi Sirhan basin in the south, ultimately leading to Mecca and Medina. His patronage is attested by an inscription naming him as "the emir al-Walid, son of the commander of the faithful". According to the historian Jere L. Bacharach, al-Walid built the nearby site of Jabal Says, likely as a Bedouin summer encampment between his base of operations in al-Qaryatayn and Qasr Burqu'. Bacharach speculates that al-Walid used the sites, located in the territory of Arab tribes, to reaffirm their loyalty, which had been critical to the Umayyads during the civil war.

Al-Walid was physically described by the 9th-century historian al-Ya'qubi as "tall and swarthy ... snub-nosed ... with a touch of gray [sic] at the tip of his beard". He noted that al-Walid "spoke ungrammatically". To his father's chagrin, al-Walid abandoned speaking the classical Arabic in which the Qur'an was written, but insisted that everyone in his company have knowledge of the Qur'an.

Caliphate

Toward the end of his reign, Abd al-Malik, supported by al-Hajjaj, attempted to nominate al-Walid as his successor, abrogating the arrangement set by Marwan whereby Abd al-Malik's brother, the governor of Egypt, Abd al-Aziz, was slated to succeed. Though the latter refused to step down from the line of succession, he died in 704 or early 705, removing the principal obstacle to al-Walid's nomination. After the death of Abd al-Malik on 9 October 705, al-Walid acceded.

He essentially continued his father's policies of centralization and expansion. Unlike his father, al-Walid heavily depended on al-Hajjaj and allowed him free rein over the eastern half of the caliphate. Moreover, al-Hajjaj strongly influenced al-Walid's internal decision-making, with officials often being installed and dismissed upon the viceroy's direction. Al-Hajjaj's prominence was such that he is discussed more frequently in the medieval Muslim sources than al-Walid or Abd al-Malik, and his time in office (694–714) represents the continuity of their reigns.

Territorial expansion

The renewal of the Muslim conquests on the eastern and western frontiers had begun under Abd al-Malik, after he secured the caliphate's domestic front. Under al-Walid, the armies of the caliphate "received a fresh impulse" and a "period of great conquests" began, in the words of the historian Julius Wellhausen. During the second half of his reign, the Umayyads reached their furthest territorial extent. 

Expansion from the eastern frontiers was overseen by al-Hajjaj from Iraq. His lieutenant governor of Khurasan, Qutayba ibn Muslim, launched several campaigns in Transoxiana (Central Asia), which had been a largely impenetrable region for earlier Muslim armies, between 705 and 715. Qutayba gained the surrender of Bukhara in 706–709, Khwarazm and Samarkand in 711–712, and Farghana in 713. He mainly secured Umayyad suzerainty through tributary alliances with local rulers, whose power remained intact. From 708 or 709, al-Hajjaj's nephew, Muhammad ibn al-Qasim, conquered Sind, the northwestern part of South Asia.

In the west, al-Walid's governor in Ifriqiya (central North Africa), Musa ibn Nusayr, another holdover from Abd al-Malik's reign, subjugated the Berbers of the Hawwara, Zenata and Kutama confederations and proceeded with his advance toward the Maghreb (western North Africa). In 708 or 709, he conquered Tangier and Sus, in the far north and south of modern-day Morocco. Musa's Berber  (freedman; pl. ), Tariq ibn Ziyad, invaded the Visigothic Kingdom of Hispania (the Iberian Peninsula) in 711, and was reinforced by an army led by Musa in the following year. By 716, a year after al-Walid's death, Hispania had been largely conquered. The massive war spoils netted by the conquests of Transoxiana, Sind and Hispania were comparable to the amounts accrued in the early Muslim conquests during the reign of Caliph Umar. 

Closer to the Umayyad seat of power in Syria, al-Walid appointed his half-brother Maslama governor of the Jazira (Upper Mesopotamia) and charged him with raiding the frontier zone with Byzantium. Though Maslama established a strong power base in his province, he achieved few territorial gains. Al-Walid entrusted most of Syria's military districts to his sons; his eldest, al-Abbas, was assigned to Homs and fought reputably in the campaigns against Byzantium alongside Maslama, while Abd al-Aziz, who also took part in the anti-Byzantine war effort, and Umar were appointed to Damascus and Jordan, respectively. Al-Walid did not participate in the campaigns and is reported to have left Syria only once as caliph, when he led the Hajj pilgrimage to Mecca in 710.

Provincial affairs

Between 693 and 700, Abd al-Malik and al-Hajjaj initiated the dual processes of establishing a single Islamic currency in place of the previously used Byzantine and Sasanian coinage and replacing Greek and Persian with Arabic as the language of the bureaucracy in Syria and Iraq, respectively. The change was implemented by al-Walid's half-brother, Abd Allah, the governor of Egypt and appointee of Abd al-Malik. These policies effected the gradual transition of Arabic as the sole official language of the state, unified the varied tax systems of the caliphate's provinces and contributed to the establishment of a more ideologically Islamic government. In 709, al-Walid dismissed Abd Allah, either as a result of mounting complaints against his corruption, which was blamed for famine in the province, the first recorded in Islamic history, or a desire to install one of his own loyalists, his  (scribe), Qurra ibn Sharik of the Banu Abs. The latter served until his death in 715 and established a more efficient means of tax collection, enlisted more troops into Egypt's army and, on al-Walid's orders, restored the mosque of Fustat.

In response to the mistreatment of Medina's pious residents by Abd al-Malik's appointed governor to the Hejaz, Hisham ibn Isma'il al-Makhzumi, al-Walid replaced Hisham with his cousin Umar ibn Abd al-Aziz in 706; the latter had friendly ties to the region's religious circles. However, Umar gained al-Hajjaj's enmity for providing safe haven to Iraqis evading his persecution. Upon the advice of al-Hajjaj, al-Walid dismissed Umar in 712 and split the governorship of the Hejaz, appointing al-Hajjaj's allies Khalid ibn Abdallah al-Qasri to Mecca and Uthman ibn Hayyan al-Murri to Medina. In Palestine, al-Walid's brother Sulayman sheltered the deposed governor of Khurasan, Yazid ibn al-Muhallab, a fugitive from al-Hajjaj's prison, in 708. Despite his initial disapproval, al-Walid pardoned Yazid as a result of Sulayman's lobbying and payment of the heavy fine that al-Hajjaj had imposed on Yazid.

Balancing of tribal factions
As a result of the Battle of Marj Rahit, which inaugurated Marwan's reign in 684, a sharp division developed among the Syrian Arab tribes, who formed the core of the Umayyad army. The loyalist tribes that supported Marwan formed the Yaman confederation, alluding to ancestral roots in Yemen (South Arabia), while the Qaysi, or northern Arab, tribes largely supported Ibn al-Zubayr. Abd al-Malik reconciled with the Qays in 691, but competition for influence between the two factions intensified as the Syrian army was increasingly empowered and deployed to the provinces, where they replaced or supplemented Iraqi and other garrisons. Al-Walid maintained his father's policy of balancing the power of the two factions in the military and administration. According to the historian Hugh N. Kennedy, it is "possible that the caliph kept it [the rivalry] on the boil so that one faction [would] not acquire a monopoly of power". His mother was genealogically affiliated with the Qays and he apparently accorded Qaysi officials certain advantages. However, Wellhausen doubts that al-Walid preferred one faction over the other, "for he had no need to do so, and it is not reported" by the medieval historians.

Public works and social welfare

From the beginning of his rule, al-Walid inaugurated public works and social welfare programs on a scale unprecedented in the caliphate's history. The efforts were financed by treasure accrued from the conquests and tax revenue. He and his brothers and sons built way-stations and dug wells along the roads in Syria and installed street lighting in the cities. They invested in land reclamation projects, entailing irrigation networks and canals, which boosted agricultural production. Al-Hajjaj also carried out irrigation and canal projects in Iraq during this period, in a bid to restore its agricultural infrastructure, damaged by years of warfare, and to find employment for its demobilized inhabitants. 

Al-Walid or his son al-Abbas founded the city of Anjar, between Damascus and the Beirut, in 714. It included a mosque, palace, residential, commercial and administrative structures. According to the art historian Robert Hillenbrand, Anjar "has the best claim of any Islamic foundation datable before 750 … to be a city", though it was probably abandoned within forty years of its construction. The historian M. A. Shaban theorizes that al-Walid's elaborate projects, in the cities of Syria and the Hejaz, had a "utilitarian purpose", but were mainly intended to provide employment, in the form of cheap labor, for the growing non-Arab populations in the cities.

Welfare programs included financial relief for the poor and servants to assist the handicapped, though this initiative was limited to Syria, and only to the Arab Muslims there. As such, Shaban considered it "a special state subsidy to the ruling class".

Patronage of great mosques
The great mosque founded by al-Walid in Damascus, later known as the Umayyad Mosque, was the greatest architectural achievement of his rule. Under his predecessors, Muslim residents had worshipped in a small  (prayer room) attached to the 4th-century cathedral of John the Baptist. By al-Walid's reign, the  could not cope with the fast-growing Muslim community and no sufficient free spaces were available in Damascus for a large congregational mosque. In 705, al-Walid had the church converted into a mosque, compensating local Christians with other properties in the city. 

Most of the structure was demolished. Al-Walid's architects replaced the demolished space with a large prayer hall and a courtyard bordered on all sides by a closed portico with double arcades. The mosque was completed in 711 and Blankinship notes that the army of Damascus, numbering some 45,000 soldiers, were taxed a quarter of their salaries for nine years to pay for its construction. The scale and grandeur of the great mosque made it a "symbol of the political supremacy and moral prestige of Islam", according to the historian Nikita Elisséeff. Noting al-Walid's awareness of architecture's propaganda value, Hillenbrand calls the mosque a "victory monument" intended as a "visible statement of Muslim supremacy and permanence". The mosque has maintained its original form until the present day.

In Jerusalem, al-Walid continued his father's works on the Temple Mount. A number of medieval Muslim accounts credit the construction of the al-Aqsa Mosque to al-Walid, while others credit his father. It is likely that the unfinished administrative and residential structures that were built opposite the southern and eastern walls of the Temple Mount, next to the mosque, date to the era of al-Walid, who died before they could be completed.

In 706 or 707, al-Walid instructed Umar ibn Abd al-Aziz to significantly enlarge the Prophet's Mosque in Medina. Its redevelopment entailed the demolition of the living quarters of Muhammad's wives and the incorporation of the graves of Muhammad and the first two caliphs, Abu Bakr and Umar. The vocal opposition to the demolition of Muhammad's home from local religious circles was dismissed by al-Walid. He lavished large sums for the reconstruction and supplied mosaics and Greek and Coptic craftsmen. According to Hillenbrand, the building of a large scale mosque in Medina, the original center of the caliphate, was an "acknowledgement" by al-Walid of "his own roots and those of Islam itself" and possibly an attempt to appease Medinan resentment at the loss of the city's political importance to Syria under the Umayyads. Other mosques that al-Walid is credited for expanding in the Hejaz include the Sanctuary Mosque around the Ka'aba in Mecca and the mosque of Ta'if.

Death and succession
Al-Walid died of an illness in Dayr Murran, an Umayyad winter estate on the outskirts of Damascus, on 23 February 715, about one year after al-Hajjaj's death. He was buried in Damascus at the cemetery of Bab al-Saghir or Bab al-Faradis and Umar ibn Abd al-Aziz led the funeral prayers. 

Al-Walid unsuccessfully attempted to nominate his son Abd al-Aziz as his successor and void the arrangements set by his father, in which Sulayman was to succeed al-Walid. Relations between the two brothers had become strained. Sulayman acceded and dismissed nearly all of al-Walid's governors. Although he maintained the militarist policies of al-Walid and Abd al-Malik, expansion of the caliphate largely ground to a halt under Sulayman.

Assessment and legacy
According to the historian Giorgio Levi Della Vida, "The caliphate of al-Walīd saw the harvest of the seed planted by the long work of ʿAbd al-Malik". In the assessment of Shaban:  Walīd I's reign (705–15/86–96) was in every way a direct continuation of his father's and was unruffled. Ḥajjāj remained in power, in fact he became more powerful, and the same policies were followed. The only difference was that the tranquillity of these years allowed Walīd to develop further the internal implications of the ʿAbdulmalik-Ḥajjāj policy.

Hawting comments that the combined reigns of al-Walid and Abd al-Malik, tied together by al-Hajjaj, represented in "some ways the high point of Umayyad power, witnessing significant territorial advances both in the east and the west and the emergence of a more marked Arabic and Islamic character in the state's public face". Domestically, it was generally a period of peace and prosperity. Kennedy asserts that al-Walid's reign was "remarkably successful and represents, perhaps, the zenith of Umayyad power", though his direct role in these successes is unclear and his primary accomplishment may have been maintaining the equilibrium between the rival factions of the Umayyad family and military.

By virtue of the conquests of Hispania, Sind and Transoxiana during his reign, his patronage of the great mosques of Damascus and Medina, and his charitable works, al-Walid's Syrian contemporaries viewed him as "the worthiest of their caliphs", according to the 9th-century historian Umar ibn Shabba. Several panegyrics were dedicated to al-Walid and his sons by al-Farazdaq, his official court poet. The latter's contemporary, Jarir, lamented the caliph's death in verse: "O eye, weep copious tears aroused by remembrance; after today there is no point in your tears being stored." The Christian poet al-Akhtal considered al-Walid to be "the caliph of God through whose  rain is sought". 

Al-Walid embraced the formal trappings of monarchy in a manner unprecedented among earlier caliphs. He resided at several palaces, including in Khunasira in northern Syria and Dayr Murran. The considerable wealth in his treasury allowed him to spend extravagantly on his relatives. Expectations of such grants among the growing number of Umayyad princes continued under his successors. The generous stipends and costly private constructions were resented by "nearly everyone else" in the caliphate and were "a drain on the treasury", according to the historian Khalid Yahya Blankinship. More significant were the costs to equip and pay the armies driving the conquests. The substantial expenditures under both Abd al-Malik and al-Walid became a financial burden on their successors, under whom the flow of war spoils, on which the caliphal economy depended, had begun to diminish. Blankinship notes that the enormous losses incurred during the assault on Constantinople alone, in 717–718, "practically wiped out the gains made under al-Walid".

Family
Compared to his brothers, al-Walid had an "exceptional number of marriages", at least nine, which "reflect both his seniority in age … and his prestige as a likely successor" to Abd al-Malik, according to the historian Andrew Marsham. The marriages were intended to forge political alliances, including with potential rival families like those of the descendants of the fourth caliph, Ali, and the prominent Umayyad statesman, Sa'id ibn al-As. Al-Walid married two great-granddaughters of the former, Nafisa bint Zayd ibn al-Hasan and Zaynab bint al-Hasan ibn al-Hasan, and a daughter of the latter, Amina, whose brother al-Ashdaq had been killed in an abortive attempt to topple Abd al-Malik. One of his wives was a daughter of a Qurayshite leader, Abd Allah ibn Muti, who was a key official under Ibn al-Zubayr. Among his other wives was a woman of the Qaysi Banu Fazara tribe, with whom he had his son Abu Ubayda. 

Marsham notes al-Walid's marriage to his first cousin, Umm al-Banin, "tied the fortunes" of Abd al-Malik and her father, Abd al-Aziz ibn Marwan. With her, al-Walid had his sons Abd al-Aziz, whom he groomed for succession, Muhammad, Marwan, and Anbasa, and a daughter, A'isha. From another Umayyad wife, Umm Abd Allah bint Abd Allah ibn Amr, a great-granddaughter of Caliph Uthman, al-Walid had his son Abd al-Rahman. He also married Umm Abd Allah's niece, Izza bint Abd al-Aziz, whom he divorced. 

Out of his twenty-two children, fifteen were born to slave concubines, including al-Abbas, whose mother was Greek. The mother of al-Walid's son Yazid III was Shahfirand, the daughter of the Sasanian prince Peroz III and granddaughter of the last Sasanian king, Yazdegerd III, who was gifted to al-Walid by al-Hajjaj. The mother of his son Ibrahim was a concubine named Su'ar or Budayra. His other sons by concubines were Umar, Bishr, Masrur, Mansur, Rawh, Khalid, Jaz, Maslama, Tammam, Mubashshir, Yahya, and Sadaqa. Around a dozen of al-Walid's sons joined in a conspiracy with other Umayyad princes and elites, under Yazid III's leadership, to topple their cousin Caliph al-Walid II, who was assassinated in April 744. Yazid III acceded but died six months later, after which he was succeeded by his half-brother Ibrahim. The latter did not attain wide recognition and was overthrown in December 744 by a distant Umayyad kinsman, Marwan II.

Notes

References

Bibliography

 

670s births
Year of birth uncertain
715 deaths
Arab Muslims
8th-century Umayyad caliphs
8th-century rulers in Asia
8th-century rulers in Africa
8th-century rulers in Europe
People from Medina
Umayyad people of the Arab–Byzantine wars